The 9th Cavalry Division (9-ya Kavaleriiskaya Diviziya) was a cavalry formation of the Russian Imperial Army.

Organization
1st Cavalry Brigade
9th Regiment of Dragoons
9th Uhlan Regiment
2nd Cavalry Brigade
9th Regiment of Hussars
9th Regiment of Cossacks
9th Horse Artillery Division

Commanders of the 2nd Brigade
1877–1878: Grigorij Fedorovitch Tchernozubov
1878: Alexander Mikhailovich Lermontov
1912: Abram Dragomirov

References

Cavalry divisions of the Russian Empire
Military units and formations disestablished in 1918